The 2011 Power Horse World Team Cup was a tennis tournament played on outdoor clay courts. It was the 33rd edition of the World Team Cup, and was part of the 250 series of the 2011 ATP World Tour. It took place at the Rochusclub in Düsseldorf, Germany. After ARAG discontinued sponsorship for the event and organizers failed to find a new sponsor, the 2011 edition of the tournament was cancelled. However a new sponsor (Power Horse) was found in January 2011, and so the 2011 edition of the Cup took place between May 15–21.

Leading the team roster, the defending champions, Argentina, also won in 2007, 2002 and 1980. They were joined by 4-time champions Sweden, Spain and United States, 3-time champions Germany (one additional title by West Germany), one-time champions Serbia (also a part of the 1990 winning team Yugoslavia), 4-time runners-up Russia and newcomers Kazakhstan.

Argentina won all the matches in the Red Group reaching the final where they were joined by Germany winner of Blue Group with a 2–1 record.

Germany won the Cup with a 2–1 win against Argentina, the double match being decisive where Philipp Petzschner and Philipp Kohlschreiber defeated Juan Ignacio Chela and Máximo González

Points

Prize money

 Places are decided with the Player Winning the Most Total Doubles Matches

Players

Red Group

Mardy Fish (#11)
Sam Querrey (#25)
John Isner (#35)

Juan Mónaco (#37)
Juan Ignacio Chela (#42)
Máximo González (#83)

Andrey Golubev (#43)
Mikhail Kukushkin (#62)

Robin Söderling (#5)
Christian Lindell (#326)
Robert Lindstedt (#22 Doubles)
Simon Aspelin (#61 Doubles)

Blue Group

Viktor Troicki (#15)
Janko Tipsarević (#33) 
Nenad Zimonjić (#4 Doubles)
Dušan Lajović (#295)

Florian Mayer (#28)
Philipp Kohlschreiber (#45)
Philipp Petzschner (#76)
Christopher Kas (#47 Doubles)

Daniel Gimeno-Traver (#46)
Marcel Granollers (#52)
Marc López (#24 Doubles)

Mikhail Youzhny (#13)
Dmitry Tursunov (#76)
Igor Andreev (#105)
Victor Baluda (#640)

Round robin

Red Group

Standings

Argentina vs Kazakhstan

United States vs Sweden

United States vs Kazakhstan

Argentina vs Sweden

United States vs Argentina

Kazakhstan vs Sweden

Blue Group

Standings

Serbia vs Germany

Spain vs Russia

Germany vs Spain

Serbia vs Russia

Germany vs Russia

Serbia vs Spain

Final

Germany vs Argentina

See also
2011 Davis Cup World Group
2011 Hopman Cup

References

External links
 Official website
 Main Draw 

Power Horse ATP World Team Championship
Power Horse World Team Cup
World Team Cup